West Hardwick is a village and civil parish in the City of Wakefield in West Yorkshire, England.  It has a population of 29.  Until 1974 it formed part of Hemsworth Rural District. The population at the 2011 Census remained minimal. Details are included in the parish of Hessle and Hill Top.

References

Villages in West Yorkshire
Civil parishes in West Yorkshire
Geography of the City of Wakefield